Richard Hasilden (died 1405), of Steeple Morden and Guilden Morden, Cambridgeshire, was an English politician.

He was a Member (MP) of the Parliament of England for Cambridgeshire in 1394 and 1399.

References

14th-century births
1405 deaths
English MPs 1394
English MPs 1399
High Sheriffs of Bedfordshire
High Sheriffs of Buckinghamshire
People from South Cambridgeshire District